Larry Namer is an entertainment and media entrepreneur of Movies USA Magazine.

Biography
Namer attended Abraham Lincoln High School, graduating in 1966. He then attended Brooklyn College, graduating in 1971 with a degree in economics. 
 
After graduation, he worked as an assistant cable splicer for what was then called Sterling Manhattan Cable which was later acquired by Time Inc. 
 
After several years as a technician, he became the Vice Chairman of the Cable TV division of the Electrical Workers Union. By age 25, he became the Director of Operations at Manhattan Cable and a year later was given sales and marketing. In 1979, he became Director of Corporate Development and was charged with building businesses derived from non-entertainment uses of the cable TV systems.

He was recruited to become VP/General Manager of Valley Cable TV in Los Angeles. It was here that he became involved in the program department as well as corporate finance, and broadened his executive skills beyond managing the technical areas.

Namer and his friend Alan Mruvka created a plan for a TV network, Movietime, that would eventually become E!Entertainment Television. Namer and Mruvka eventually sold their stake in the company, which is now owned by Comcast. 

In 1989, he was awarded the President's Award from the National Cable Television Association (NCTA). While remaining on the Board of E!, he started a media company in Russia called Comspan Communications. The company promoted or produced several rock concerts and brought the soap opera Santa Barbara to Russia. Additionally, the company was heavily involved in live sporting events and produced and promoted the Champions Tennis Tour with Conners, McEnroe, Borg and others. They also brought the Harlem Globetrotters to Russia in 1995 marking the first time the Globetrotters visited Russia in almost 50 years when Wilt Chamberlain was on that team.

Namer has played a significant part in launching several other TV networks around the world and interactive television, serving as a consultant to Microsoft. After E!, Namer created and launched several companies in the United States and overseas, including Steeplechase Media, Comspan Communications, Comspan Russia, and, with Martin Pompadur and Jean Zhang, Metan Development Group.

In September 2011, Namer was named as the first recipient of the “Aaron Spelling Award” at 4th Annual Investment Seminar & Global Independence in Beverly Hills.

In October 2011, Namer joined the advisory board of SuperBox Inc.

Mr. Namer currently serves as President/CEO, Metan. Metan's flagship series is Hello! Hollywood!, a weekly entertainment news series tailored to Chinese audiences, offering up the latest in celebrity, pop culture and lifestyle news. Since its launch in summer 2009, the series is now available on over 40 television stations in China and six in North America reaching over one billion Mandarin speaking viewers. Hello! Hollywood's premier content is also available on 10 of China's top online portals, reaching more than four million viewers weekly. From his work and experience in Metan, Larry Namer offers his two-cents about where the Chinese market is headed.

References

External links
LJNMedia.com
 

Living people
Abraham Lincoln High School (Brooklyn) alumni
Brooklyn College alumni
American company founders
Year of birth missing (living people)